Niyokwizerwa Bosco professionally known as Niyo Bosco (born May 25, 2000) is a Rwandan artist, songwriter and guitarist a child prodigy who developed into the most creative musical figures. He's also known as a songwriter and he has written a lot of songs including Ibuye by Vestine & Dorcas, Ishyano , Urungi and othes. He lost his sight at 12 due to malaria,

Discography 
He is well known for his first single.

Singles and collaborations

References 

2000 births

Rwandan male singers
Living people
Rwandan artists